Resurrection Reality is an EP by American hardcore band Vision of Disorder, released in early 1998.

Track listing
"Clone"
"Soul Craft" (Bad Brains cover) (old version)
"Element" (demo)
"Ways to Destroy One's Ambition" (demo)

References

1998 EPs
Vision of Disorder albums